William Richard Mitchell (February 22, 1930 – April 1, 2014) was a Canadian professional ice hockey defencemen. He played in one National Hockey League game for the Detroit Red Wings during the 1963–64 NHL season, on February 23, 1964 against the Montreal Canadiens. The rest of his career, which lasted from 1948 to 1973, was spent in various minor leagues. He also played for the Canadian national team, winning a silver medal at the 1962 World Championships. He died at a hospice in Toledo, Ohio in 2014, of kidney failure.

Coaching
Bill Mitchell started his coaching career with the University of Toledo hockey team in 1966 where they were 1967 Midwest Collegiate Hockey Association Champions.

Career statistics

Regular season and playoffs

International

Coaching

See also
 List of players who played only one game in the NHL

References

External links
 

1930 births
2014 deaths
Canadian expatriate ice hockey players in the United States
Canadian ice hockey defencemen
Cincinnati Wings players
Clinton Comets players
Deaths from kidney failure
Detroit Red Wings players
Fort Wayne Komets players
Ice hockey people from Ontario
Ontario Hockey Association Senior A League (1890–1979) players
Sportspeople from St. Catharines
Stratford Kroehlers players
Toledo Blades players
Toledo Hornets players
Toledo Mercurys players
Toronto Marlboros players
Windsor Bulldogs (1963–1964) players
Windsor Bulldogs (OHA) players